Tarom Sofla District (meaning "Lower Tarom") is a district (bakhsh) in Qazvin County, Qazvin Province, Iran. At the 2006 census, its population was 15,409, in 4,145 families.  The District has one city: Sirdan.  The District has four rural districts (dehestan): Chuqur Rural District, Khandan Rural District, Kuhgir Rural District, and Niyarak Rural District.

References 

Districts of Qazvin Province
Qazvin County